This is a list of TV services available on digital terrestrial, satellite, internet streaming and cable systems in France.

National channels (Metropolitan France)  
List available from March 2021:

National Channels (Overseas France) 

Previously, France Ô was on channels 6/7/8 in Overseas France and channel 19 in Metropolitan France until 24 August 2020.

Regional channels 
List available from 5 April 2016:

Regional Channels (Overseas France)

Satellite television

Bis Télévisions 
6ter
Automoto La chaîne
AB1
AB3
ABXplore
Action
Action HD
Animaux
Animaux HD
Arte
Arte HD
beIN Sports 1
beIN Sports 1 HD
beIN Sports 2
beIN Sports 2 HD
BFM TV
C8
Canal+ (free to air programming only)
Chasse et Pêche
Chérie 25

CNews
CStar
Dorcel TV

France 2
France 2 HD
France 24
France 3
France 4
France 5
France Info 
Game One
Gulli
TF1 Séries Films
LCP-AN/Public Sénat
 Lucky Jack TV
M6
M6 HD
Mangas
NBC Golf Channel France
NRJ 12
RMC Story
RMC Découverte
RTL9
RTL9 HD
Science et Vie TV
LCI
TF1
TF1 HD
TFX
TMC
Toute l'Histoire
Trek
Téva
 Via Stella
W9
XXL

Canal+ 
This is a list of channels carried by Canal+, as of February 2016:
 13ème Rue Universal
 A+ (French television station)
 Automoto La chaîne
 AB1
 Action
 Al Jazeera Arabic
 Al Jazeera Documentary
 Al Jazeera English
 Al Jazeera Mubasher
 Animaux
 Arte France
 Arte Germany
 beIN Sports 1
 beIN Sports 2
 beIN Sports 3
 BET
 BFM Business 
 BFM TV
 Boing France
 Boomerang France
 Stingray Classica
 C8
 Canal+
 Canal+ Cinéma
 Canal+ Sport 360
 Canal+ Foot
 Canal+ Kids
 Canal+ Docs
 Canal+ Grand Ecran
 Canal+ Séries
 Canal+ Sport
 Canal+ Play
 Canal+ A la demande
 Canal Hollywood
 Canal J
 Cartoon Network France
 Chérie 25 
 Ciné+ Premier
 Ciné+ Classic
 Ciné+ Club
 Ciné+ Émotion
 Ciné+ Famiz
 Ciné+ Frisson
 CNBC France
 CNews
 Colmax TV
 Comédie+
 CStar
 Discovery Channel France
 Discovery Science France
 Disney Channel France
 Disney Junior France
 Disney XD France
 Disney Cinema France
 Stingray Djazz 
 Dorcel TV
 Dorcel XXX
 Encyclo
 Euronews
 Eurosport 1
 Eurosport 2
 Extreme Sports Channel
 France 2
 France 3
 France 4
 France 5
 France 24 French
 France 24 English
 France 24 Arabic

 Game One
 FC Girondins de Bordeaux#Media
 Golf+
 GONG
 GONG MAX
 Gulli
 History France
 InfoSport+
 I24news
 J-One
RMC Sport

 KTO
 La Chaîne Météo
 LCI
 LCP AN Public Sénat
 L'Équipe 21
 Le PMorn
 M6
 M6 Music
 Mangas
 MCM
 MCM Top
 Melody
 Mezzo
 Mezzo Live HD
 Mosaique
 MTV
 MN+
 Movies Now
 MTV Hits
 Nat Geo Wild France
 National Geographic France
 Nickelodeon France
 Nickelodeon Junior France
 Nickelodeon Teen France
 Nollywood TV
 Non Stop People
 NRJ 12
 NRJ Hits
 Numéro 23
 OCS Géants
 OCS Pulp
 OCS Max
 OL Play
 Paramount Channel France
 Paris Première
 Pass Series
 Penthouse TV
 Penthouse Quickies
 Penthouse Black 
 Penthouse Gold
 Penthouse Passion
 Pink X
 Piwi+
 Planète+
 Planète+ Adventure
 Planète+ Crime
 Playboy TV
 QVC
 RFM TV
 RMC Découverte
 RTL9
 Science et Vie TV
 Seasons
 serieclub
 Sundance TV
 Syfy France
 TCM Cinéma France
 Télétoon+
 Télétoon+1
 Téva
 TF1
 TFX
 TiJi
 TMC
 Toute l'Histoire
 Trace Urban
 Trace Sport Stars
 Trek
 TV Breizh
 TV5Monde
 8 Mont-Blanc
 Ushuaia TV
 W9
 XXL

Defunct channels 
 France Ô - defunct public station
 Direct 8 - defunct commercial station
 Direct Star - defunct commercial music station
 Antennes Locales
 Discovery Real Time France
 Discovery Family
 Equidia Live
 MCS Tennis
 Equidia Life
 Kombat Sport
 SFR Sport
 TV8 Mont-Blanc
 Voyage
 Téléfoot
 Renault TV
 Numéro 23
 OL TV
 Muzzik
 Motors TV
 Motorsport.tv
 Onzéo
 Sport365
 Encyclo
 Escales
 MCM Pop
 MCM Africa
 MTV Pulse
 MTV Base
 MTV Idol
 MyCuisine
 Planète+ Thalassa
 Best of Shopping
 Nolife
 Vivolta
 La Cinq - defunct commercial network
 La Sept - defunct cultural network (part-time) 
 TV6, defunct commercial music station 
 Virgin 17 - defunct commercial music station
 Europe 2 TV - defunct commercial music station
 June
 TPS Star
 TPS Cinéstar
 TPS Homecinéma
 TPS Cinéculte
 TPS Cinétoile
 TPS Cinextrême
 TPS Cinéfamily
 TPS Cinéclub
 TPS Cinécomedy
 TPS Foot
 Planète+ A&E
 Canal+ Décalé
 Canal+ Family
 Canal+ 3D
 Campagnes TV
 Planète+ CI
 Ma Chaîne Sport
 Campus
 Brava France
 Stingray Brava
 Girondins TV
 Penthouse HD
 MCS Bien Etre
 MCS Extreme
 M6 Boutique & Co
 M6 Boutique
 Liberty TV
 DJAZZ.tv
 Frenchlover TV
 Sundance Channel
 HD1
 AB Moteurs
 AB4
 Ciné FX
 Ciné Polar
 Polar
 NT1
 M6 Music Club
 M6 Music Hits
 M6 Music Black
 Ciné+ Star
 OCS Novo
 OCS Happy
 OCS Choc
 Clique TV
 OCS City
 Cuisine+
 Libido TV
 Sport+
 TF6 - defunct commercial station
 Jimmy - defunct commercial station
 Maison+ - defunct lifestyle commercial station
 TV Quatre - defunct commercial station

See also 
 Television in France
 Television in Belgium

References

Television Stations
France